This article shows the development timeline of telephone companies in Birmingham, England.

Exchange names are in italics.

Following the granting of a patent to Alexander Graham Bell in 1876, and the creation of the Bell Telephone Company, USA:
The Telephone Company Ltd (Bell's Patents) registered 14 June 1878, London. Opened in London 21 August 1879 - Europe's first telephone exchange
The Edison Telephone Company of London Ltd, registered 2 August 1879. Opened in London 6 September 1879.
Henry J T Piercy of Broad Street Engine Works, Birmingham, 1879, independently created a service at Exchange Chambers (the old Iron and Steel Exchange), on the corner of New Street and Stephenson Place, (built 1865, demolished 1965, new building is HSBC bank), creating the Midland Telephone Exchange Company
becoming Birmingham Central Exchange June 1880
Wolverhampton 1880
Jewellery Quarter 1880, 26 Frederick Street (Jewellers Exchange)
Aston Exchange
Smethwick Exchange
United Telephone Company formed from The Telephone Company Ltd (Bell's Patents) and The Edison Telephone Company of London, 1880
Provincial Telephone Company formed, 17 February 1881
Provincial takes over Midland
National Telephone Company (NTC) set up 10 March
Walsall Exchange, 1881
Exchange Chambers exchange moved to 40 Bennetts Hill/Colmore Row 1882-1897
Provincial transferred to National Telephone Company 1883
Provincial dissolved 18 September 1884
Edgbaston, Moseley, West Bromwich 1886
New National Telephone Company formed from the old NTC plus The United, the Lancashire, and the Cheshire Telephone Companies, 1889
Trunk link Birmingham to Coventry 1889
Trunk link Birmingham to London 1890
Birmingham Trunk Exchange, General Post Office (GPO), Pinfold Street, Victoria Square, 4 May 1895
National Telephone Company builds 19 Newhall Street, an ornate red brick and terra cotta building, replacing Bennetts Hill as Central exchange, 1896/7
National sells trunk lines to GPO 6 February 1897
National opens Midland Exchange 14 November 1908 at 60 Hill Street
Jewellers exchange moved to 19 Newhall Street, 1909
General Post Office (GPO) takes over National Telephone Company, 1 January 1912 (transferring 1,565 exchanges 9,000 employees, cost £12,515,264.)
Director telephone system introduced into Birmingham, 1931. 
Telephone House, Newhall Street opened, 1936, Lionel Street/Newhall Street
Midland exchange closed 29 October 1961
BT Tower, Birmingham, built, 1967, close to Telephone House.
Hill Street closed 1971 and demolished 1972.
Telephone House closed 20 November 1979. staff transferred to Brindley Telephone Exchange, across the road (computerised)
British Telecom takes over from GPO, 1984

See also
Timeline of the telephone
Telephone exchange
Director telephone system

Sources
Hold the Line Please - The Story of the Hello Girls, Sally Southall, 
A History of the Birmingham Telephone Area, Tupling, R. E., 1978

External links
BT Archives

Birmingham timeline
Telephone companies in Birmingham
Telephone companies in Birmingham
 
Telephone companies in Birmingham, England
Telephone companies in Birmingham
History of telecommunications in the United Kingdom